Ali Hossaini (b. West Virginia, 1962) is an American artist, philosopher, theatrical producer, television producer, and businessperson. In 2010, The New York Times described him as a "biochemist turned philosopher turned television producer turned visual poet". In 2017 Hossaini published the Manual of Digital Museum Planning and subsequently became co-director of National Gallery X, a King's College London partnership that explores the future of art and cultural institutions. Prior to National Gallery X Hossaini worked with King's College to develop Connected Culture, an action research programme that tested cultural applications for 5G supported by Ericsson. As a working artist and producer, Hossaini's genre-spanning career includes installations, performances and hundreds of media projects. Since 2018 Hossaini has worked with security think tank Royal United Services Institute and, in a 2019 special edition of its journal, he assessed the threat from AI from the perspective of biology.

Early life and education (1962-1994)
The son of an Iraqi father and American mother, Hossaini was born in West Virginia in the United States. Hossaini came of age during the Reagan Era, and became a producer and host (1989-1994) for Alternative Views, a television program that offered progressive news, commentary and interviews. He also produced short films that were distributed by Deep Dish Television and went on to write for the Village Voice and other publications.

Education
Hossaini studied at Washington University in St. Louis, Columbia University & The University of Texas at Austin where he was awarded a doctorate in philosophy in 1994. His thesis – Archaeology Of The Photograph traced the development of optics from Sumer to the Hellenistic period. This thesis would go on to inform much of his subsequent forward-looking work in academic publishing, media technology and optics including contributions to the Encyclopedia of Twentieth Century Photography and Vision of The Gods: How Optics Shaped History published by Logos (journal).

Career

Early roles (1994-2001)
From 1994 to 1996 Hossaini worked as a sponsoring editor at the University of Texas Press Austin where he academic manuscripts in the humanities, including classics, media studies, and women's studies. Hossaini helped launch The Surrealist Revolution at the University of Texas Press, a book series whose inaugural volume, Surrealist Woman, revealed the suppressed histories of female artists. He also published one of the first electronic books, Istanbul Boy, in 1996. and produced one of the first public webcasts, Come to Me, that same year.

In 1996, Hossaini left Texas to join the staff of The Site, a San Francisco-based television newsmagazine on MSNBC, as a producer and commentator. He did pioneering work in social media by building audience interaction into television. He moved to ZDTV in 1997 where he continued to develop interactive projects that integrated audience tools like chat and webcams into television programs. From 1999 to 2001, Hossaini was a vice president for community at Oxygen Media, he developed applications for video sharing and managed presence to integrate numerous corporate acquisitions into a single network.

Rainbow DBS and Voom HD Networks (2002-2009)
As a Director of Programming & Executive Producer for Rainbow DBS (later Voom HD Networks) from 2002 until 2009, Hossaini managed production, licensing and broadcast efforts for the first dedicated art documentary and video art television channels – Gallery HD, LAB HD, as well as Equator HD high-definition television channel devoted to travel, culture and natural history until 2009.

Robert Wilson Video Portraits
As executive producer of LAB HD, Hossaini fostered the creation of several dozen avant-garde films, including the Voom Portraits Robert Wilson, a project which became well known after Vanity Fair featured one of its subjects, actor Brad Pitt, on its cover.
The series of HDTV videos feature performances by Hollywood stars, including Robert Downey Jr., Isabella Rossellini and Willem Dafoe, European and Persian royalty and notable artists. The Voom Portraits Robert Wilson exhibition opened in 2007 at Paula Cooper Gallery and Philips de Pury Gallery in New York City.

Hossaini describes the genesis of the project in Robert Wilson Video Portraits, an edited volume published by ZKM. In a separate interview for HD TV Technology Hossaini noted that his early adoption of HD video in the production of Wilson's portrait enabled the conscious evolution of the video art to be consumer akin to other art forms such as painting.

"The other idea of the video portrait is to do a very playful extension of the painting. Wilson is noted for very, very slow movement in all of his theater and film work that he has done before. In this case, he wanted to create these things that almost look like a still life on the wall, but then they started gradually to move. The more you watch them, the more you see in terms of that movement. They sit up on your wall as permanent installations, so video is the perfect medium for this kind of exercise."

Greg Moyer of Voom HD Networks would go on to comment that this production "brought Robert Wilson to high definition in some regards. He'd been using the medium prior, but we facilitated every aspect of the portraits."

The establishment of Pantar Productions (2009-2011)

In 2009 Hossaini expanded his independent consulting and production activity under the umbrella of Pantar Productions. From 2009-2011 he produced content for clients that included NHK, High Fidelity HDTV, The Submarine Channel Submarine Channel - Interactive Storytelling and Indieflix, amongst others. In this time Hossaini produced the Metropolis Art Competition for Babelgum productions – a short film competition in which a jury (including Isabella Rossellini and Guy Maddin) awarded an emerging film maker $20,000 first prize and screened their short film in Times Square. Hossaini also produced Epitaph an autobiographical short directed by Dennis Hopper shortly before his death.

Through Pantar Productions Hossaini realised the first iteration his Ouroboros: The History of The Universe art installation at the Ise Cultural Foundation Ise Cultural Foundation in Soho, New York. In a review for The New York Times Dennis Overbye remarked that the work "bypass the rational part of the brain and head[s] straight for someplace deeper, to make us experience the universe not as a concatenation of forces but as a poem."

Ouroboros would set a trend for much of Hossaini's subsequent artistic and professional activity, ostensibly exploring how art and technology can, in his words (2016), "help facilitate a shift from authentic objects to authentic experiences."

Luminaria (2012-2014)
In 2012 Hossaini was approached by the City of San Antonio to develop a five-year strategic plan to transform their Lumniaria Arts festival into a globally significant festival of arts and ideas. Hossaini's preliminary plan developed with Dissident Industries, a New York-based firm, would be to alternate the festival annually with a workshop or "a participatory lab for festival development and experimentation.". The plan advocated the expansion of the new biannual event into a ten-day festival and was credited with aligning the festival with downtown development initiatives and the city's strategic ambitions.

In a 2014 interview Hossaini commented that the goal was to convert Luminaria from a "by San Antonio, for San Antonio" event into a "by San Antonio, for San Antonio, and for the rest of the world" The president of the Luminaria board credited the report with a helping to instigate paradigm shift for the organisation – "Living event to event isn't working,.. Now we're talking about Luminaria as a concept, as an organization (instead of a once-a-year event)"

Cinema Arts Network (2011-2017)
In 2011 Hossaini became CEO of CAN: Cinema Arts Network, a UK-based consortium of cinemas and art centers funded by the BFI. The company launched with a live broadcast of the London Symphony Orchestra from the Barbican Centre. Cinema Arts Network completed a national broadband "Network for the arts" in 2014, and in 2015 Hossaini announced CAN 2.0, an initiative to engage audiences via smartphones in sixteen UK arts venues. Hossaini remarked at the Johannesberg Summit of Global Congress of the Wireless Broadband Alliance technological convergence allows initiatives like this Cinema Arts Network to proflierate, nothing that connectivity  alone is a "transformative factor that catalyses transformative changes in society."

Manual of Digital Museum Planning
In 2017, Hossaini published the Manual of Digital Museum Planning which the publisher, Rowman & Littlefield, describe as the comprehensive guide to digital planning, development, and operations for museum professionals and students of museums studies and arts administration.

King's College
Since 2017 Hossaini has been Visiting Research Fellow in the Department of Informatics at King's College London. In 2019 he co-founded National Gallery X, a joint research studio maintained by the National Gallery and King's College London. In 2020 Hossaini was promoted to Visiting Senior Research Fellow in the Department of Engineering at King's College London. In this capacity, he serves as co-director of National Gallery X, and his responsibilities include curating and collaborating with studio residents and building creative links between the Gallery and King's College London researchers.

Connected Culture
In 2016 Ericsson and King's College London announced that Hossaini would lead Connected Culture, a joint project that applies 5G networking techniques to immersive media. Connected Culture examined how vision, hearing and touch perform over 5G networks. Public workshops were held at National Theatre Studio, RADA and Sadler's Wells, and Hossaini tested a new spatial audio system Soundscapes within his 3D video installation Ouroboros. As a result of Hossaini's project in June 2018 the city of London announced they would be hosting the world's first 5G connected theatre in collaboration with Berlin. The project report contains details on how to manage art-science collaborations and reports on perceptual tolerances to network faults.

With the outbreak of COVID-19 pandemic in 2020 Ericsson explored work of the connected culture initiative noting the way that well before an event like COVID-19 the Hossaini's vision "had the ambition to show how the three sensory elements of touch, sight and sound could be heightened to make any experience much more immersive.". In a virtual panel as a part of the Ericsson UnBoxed Office social series, "5G: Connecting Culture", Hosseini noted that with 5G, independent artists will have the same kind of access that major cultural institutions do and suggested that this will help drive a major cultural explosion in small towns around the world as creativity is going to be one of the primary ways of maintaining connection to others.

National Gallery X 
In 2019 King's College London, The National Gallery and Google Arts & Culture formally launched 'National Gallery X' (NGX), a collaborative research and development programme. Located in a hub next to the main National Gallery building, the NGX examines how technological inventions can be applied to cultural institutions in the future and inform new kinds of cultural experiences. National Gallery X (NGX) is part of an innovation lab within the Department of Digital, Culture, Media, and Sport's (DCMS) Culture is Digital policy programme. The Culture is Digital programme was launched in 2018 at the Gallery by the then Secretary of State to stimulate the relationship between the culture and technology sectors.

As co-director of NGX Hossaini describes the goal of the undertaking is to "spark a modern renaissance" by bringing together people who are cross-trained artists, scientists and engineers to create "new forms of spatialised experience that our predecessors couldn't have dreamed of". National Gallery X was launched in September 2019 by Gabriele Finaldi and speakers included Tim Berners-Lee.

Leading the COVID-19 pandemic Response 
In 2020 National Gallery X and Hossaini commissioned and released their first commission as a virtual versions of an art installation that reveals the sounds of colour in paintings virtual in response the COVID-19 pandemic. KIMA: Colour in 360 by Analema Group launched on the second of June 2020 and consists of three video works that transform colour data from Jan van Eyck's Arnolfini Portrait, Claude Monet's Water Lilies (Monet series), and Vincent van Gogh's Wheat Field with Cypresses into 360-degree light and sound experiences. Two of these were made immediately available to view on YouTube and the National Gallery website with the van Eyck-inspired work following later. The virtual artist residency by Analema Group was a part of a revised programme that takes the lockdown as its context and subject and offers a series of creative and philosophical responses to the new world coronavirus has created.

In an interview on the project Hossaini commented that the COVID-19 pandemic had radically accelerated the nature of artistic expression as well as shifted the fundamental core value propositions of museums as well as augmented their underlying architectonic logic:Covid-19 slammed the accelerator on long-term trends. Since the 90s I’ve staked my career on convergence: the idea that the Internet will absorb every other medium. It started with mail then print. I remember when people said no one will watch TV on their computer let alone their phone. I prefer making the future to predicting it, but I think the next wave of convergence is architecture. I call KIMA: Colour in 360 a ‘boundless meditation on the essence of art’, but it is also a meditation on walls and the intersection of physical and virtual space. During the Covid-19 lockdown, artist's tools have evolved at warp speed, and more importantly, so have people's habits. As the National Gallery and other cultural places re-open, they’ll have access to vigorous new tech that make buildings more like websites while distributing key features of architecture over media channels. Interactivity, personalization and other features we take for granted online will become part of places, and distinctions between physical and virtual will fade as architecture comes online.Subsequently, on the 16th of June 2020, the NGX launched their digital events programme in collaboration with the London media art platform Art in Flux. Art in Flux‘ART IN FLUX @ NGX - GENDER*UCK - Media art beyond and between concepts of Gender' - presented new-media artwork exploring the boundaries between art and technology.

In a press release released by the National Gallery the gallery Director Gabriele Finaldi commented:It may seem paradoxical that a Gallery whose doors are shut due to the pandemic can be even more creative than before. But the Analema Group's residency at NGX shows how the nation's pictures are inspiring a new generation of digital artists to respond in unprecedented ways even in lockdownWhile Hossaini summarised - For 200 years, the National Gallery has welcomed the world through its doors, then the unimaginable happened. We had to bring the National Gallery into people's homes. Analema has given us a boundless meditation on the essence of painting.

The AI Gallery 
In 2021 Hossaini co-curated with Neus Torres Tamarit an online collection of works which have created with Machine learning and other Artificial intelligence techniques. Which he describes as a 'cultural exchange program between AI and humanity'

The gallery is the result of a partnership with the UK Research and Innovation's Trustworthy Autonomous Systems Hub (TAS Hub), National Gallery X the exhibition launched at Trusting Machines?, a conference co-produced with the Royal United Services Institute(RUSI) and the TAS Hub.

The aim of Trusting Machines? was to spark insights and deeper conversations. With the exhibition noting that:

the AI Gallery will continue as a 'cultural exchange programme' between humanity and the systems whose influence - and mystery - grows daily. Machine arts challenge traditional notions of creativity, but we think it is vital not to anthropomorphise autonomous systems. As the exhibition grows, we will work with the TAS Hub and beyond to develop a rigorous framework for understanding the emerging palettes of AI art and how they fit into human society.

As a part of the exhibition Hossaini also directed and co-produced a 21-minute video artwork entitled 'The First' with Luca Vigano. The film is viewable online. In a statement released by the Gallery Hossaini and Vigano comment that: "The Turing Test is a classic way of distinguishing humans from AI. What happens when humans turn the tables on machines? This film explores a future scenario where the rights of sentient beings clash with freedom, identity and ethical judgment."'The First' work was presented again at the Royal United Services Institute in a subsequent interview and q&a as a part of the first day of the Trusting Machines conference. The full presentation was archived by RUSI and remains online.

Groupthink - National Gallery x Ars Electronica 
In September 2011, The National Gallery partnered with Ars Electronica to present Groupthink - a collaborative artwork conceived by Hossaini in his role as National Gallery X co-director. The work was the result of a broader artistic team who was in dual residency at National Gallery X and the UKRI TAS Hub. The aim of the residency was to guide research on the implications of a neurally connected society.

The premise of the project was the concept of "The Internet of Neurons" and the observation that explosion of biohybrid technologies is bringing our bodies and brains online. This then drove the question of what happens when all are connected? The aim of Groupthink was to. give a glimpse into a future where "art emerges from the heart".

During the performance Audiences anywhere could join via webcam. Software would then detect their pulse and translate it into a live visual score performed by sitarist Shama Rahman and percussionist Mick Grierson. Located in the National Gallery's basement, a resident AI algorithm then reinterpreted famous paintings in the museum above as a pulsating video environment that responded both to and entangled the audience and performers as 'entangled roots, limbs and life of imaginary forests'.

5G Trailblazers Campaign 
In early 2021, Hossaini was recognised as one of 25 '5G Trailblazer' as a part of Ericsson's campaign to promote the technology. The campaign was designed to " champion 5G's best and brightest; those who are leading the charge for change in 5G connectivity"  In their recognition of Hossaini the company noted that:Academic, writer and artist Ali Hossaini has been exploring how 5G can enhance the arts through immersive experiences, creating the world's first 5G-enabled theatre in partnership with Arts Council England...Ali's creative approach to 5G provides a unique vision for the future of culture, commerce and technology.

Speaking and presentations
Hossaini is a well-known speaker on art, technology and politics. In 2015 and 2016, The New York Times invited him to present at Art for Tomorrow, and in 2017 he hosted a weekend on Democracy & Film for The New York Times at Athens Democracy Forum.

In 2019 Hossaini worked with security think tank Royal United Services Institute and, to produce a special edition of its journal and assessed the threat from AI from the perspective of biology. In the text he invited essays 4 distinguished biologists who wrote detailed responses The texts surveyed the challenges AI creates for security and defence from the level of individuals to states and then the globe. The edition noted how in both creative and defence contexts AI provokes profound questions about what it means to be human and creates innumerable risks and opportunities to the current security environment. Hossaini noted in his own text that the "rather than from an intelligence explosion and its consequences, the potential threat may come instead from AI's ability to acquire agency"

Discussions and lectures

2016 

 Artificial Intelligence: Can Machines Possess Emotions? Panelist, Edinburgh Digital Entertainment Festival
 The Impact of 5G on culture & creative industry, keynote, Global congress of Wireless Broadband
 Alliance, Liverpool 
 How 5G is Transforming Arts, Culture & Creative Industry, keynote, Johannesberg Summit, Sweden
 Designing Experience, keynote, Chinese Association of Museums, Taipei
 Digital Engagement in Museums, National History Museum, Taipei

2017 

 Staging the Future: Artificial Intelligence & Conflict, moderator & coproducer, RUSI / Atlantic Council, London.
 Democracy & Film, host & moderator, New York Times Athens Democracy Forum, Costa Navarino, Greece.
 Industry 4.0: Media, telecommunications & the Smart City, International Forum on Creative Industry, Ministry of Culture, Taipei, Taiwan
 Connecting Cultures, keynote, International Forum on Creative Industries, Ministry of Culture, Taipei
 Is your organisation fit for a complex & uncertain future?, Royal United Services Institute, London Technology Ecosystem of Museums, Chinese Association of Museums, Taipei
 Digital Curating, Keynote lecture, International Digital Culture Forum, Taichung, Taiwan
 Digital museum planning, American Alliance of Museums conference, St. Louis

2018 

 Is Art Alive? How AI Technology & Algorithms are Changing the Nature of Creativity, Art Leaders Network, New York Times conference, Berlin.
 What about Wireless? Network Performing Art Production Workshop, New World Symphony, Florida.

2019 

 Building the 5G Museum (lecture & panel discussion), Cultech Festival, Taipei.
 What's Britain's Best Startup City?, MIPIM UK Summit, London. 
 Putting Poetry in the Machine, Design Shanghai.
 Futures of the Real (keynote lecture), Goldsmith's, University, London.

2019 

 Ericsson Unboxed: Creating culture in times of confinement (panel discussion)

2020 

 5G: Creating culture in times of confinement, May 2020, Ericsson Unboxed 
 The Immersive Art Revolution, BFI London Film Festival 2020 
 New Heritage, Art In Flux, National Gallery X, July 23, 2020 
 Gender*uck, National Gallery X,

2021 

 Agile Bureaucracy and a New Renaissance, Sep, 2021, Creative Bureaucracy Festival, Berlin
 Groupthink, Sep, 2021, Ars Electronica Festival 
 What can science offer the arts?, Nov, 2021, Medi-Culture Festival, London
 What an AI Sees, Jun, 2021,Trusting Machines Conference, London
 The First: Conversation with Luca Viganò, Jun, 2021,Trusting Machines Conference, Londo
 Adaptive Architecture, Mar 2021, Institute for Psychiatry, Psychology and Neuroscience, King's College London
 Can Machines Come Alive? What biology tells us about AI., June, 2021, Trusting Machines Conference, London 
 The 5G Museum, VRHAM REAL-IN Festival, June 2021

Productions and artistic work
Hossaini's productions have been featured in the Whitney Biennial, the Tribeca Film Festival, Brooklyn Academy of Music and other venues.

Notable works

Ouroboros 
Hossaini's Ouroboros treats the history of the universe as an animated visual poem. The first iteration of the work was presented at the Ise Cultural Foundation Ise Cultural Foundation in Soho, New York in 2010. In a review for The New York Times, Dennis Overbye remarked that the work "bypass the rational part of the brain and head[s] straight for someplace deeper, to make us experience the universe not as a concatenation of forces but as a poem."

Constructed of an hour of looping animations, and it uses Chromodepth technology to create strongly holographic images that remain sharp without glasses. It has been installed in Beijing at the Museum of the Central Academy of Fine Arts, the Museum of Outdoor Art in Denver and other locations.

Artwork and exhibitions

2007 

 Living  Voom, curated  selection  of  LAB  productions,  Scanners  Film  Festival,  The  Lincoln  Center  
 Curated  selection  of  LAB  productions,  Borderlines  Festival,  Beijing,  China  
 Unperception  Now,  Janos  Gat  Gallery, New  York  City   
 Curated  selection  of  LAB  productions,  SF  Cinemateque,  San  Francisco  
 Curated  selection  of  LAB  productions,  Pacific  Film  Archive,  Berkeley,  California  
 Curated  selection  of  LAB  productions, Orchard  47,  New  York  City  
 Jeanne  Moreau  &  Isabelle  Huppert  Video  Portraits,  Couvent des  Cordeliers,  Paris

2008 

 Divine  Machines,  film ,  The  Hackney  Empire,  London, UK
 Epiphany,  video  installation,  American  Museum  of  the  Moving  Image,  New  York  City
 Noumema,  Time  is  the  Moving  Image  &  The  Same  River,  short plays,  Water  Mill  Center  for  the  Arts
 Installation  of  productions  from  LAB,  American  Museum  of  the  Moving  Image,  New  York  City
 Curated  selection  of  LAB  productions,  Scope  Art  Fair, New York City
 Unperception  Now,  film,  Montreal  Festival  of  Film  on  Art,  Montreal,  Canada

2009 

 Baghdad  Transcendental,  sculpture  &  photography  installation,  The  Drop,  New  York  City  
 Epiphany:  Prints,  The  Kaufman  Arcade,  New  York City  
 Epiphany:  Volcano,  Gallery  8,  New  York  City

2010 

 Memory  Begins, video  installation, White Box, New York City
 Ouroboros, video installation, Ise Cultural Foundation, New York City
 Oceanic  Verses,  operatic video, New York City Opera
 Caro Ben Mio,  live video,  Galapagos Art Space,  New  York City

2011 

 Fabric of Life, solo show of prints & video, Ethan Cohen Fine Arts, New York City
 Executive  Privilege,  video installation, White Box, New  York  City  
 Fading  Civilizations, video  triptych, SoundRes Festival, Lecce, Italy
 The  Aging  Magician,  musical  theater,  The  Kitchen,  New  York  City  
 Fading  Civilizations, video triptych, The Kitchen, New  York City  
 Ouroboros,  video  installation,  Museum  of  Outdoor  Art, Denver, Colorado 
 Memory  Begins,  video  installation, SudLab,  Naples,  Italy

2012 

 Illusory Production, video installation, CAFA Museum, Beijing, China
 Epiphany, video installation, Mediations Biennale, Poznan, Poland
 Ouroboros, video installation, Clews Foundation, Denver, Colorado
 Oceanic Verses, video installation & live performance, The Kennedy Center, Washington, DC
 Ouroboros, video installation, Clews Foundation, Denver, Colorado
 Oceanic Verses, video installation & live performance, River to River Festival, New York City
 Ouroboros, video installation, Clews Foundation, Denver, Colorado
 Hermetica, video screening, Electronic Art Intermix, New York City
 Divine Machines, Museum of Optography, Sharjah

2013 

 Oceanic Verses, video installation & live performance, The Barbican, London, UK

2014 

 Oceanic Verses, video installation & live performance, Dillon Gallery, New York

2015 

 Epiphany, video installation & live performance, BAM, New York 
"Epiphany: the Cycle of Life" was made by Hossaini, composer Paola Prestini, librettist Niloufar Talebi and choral master Francisco Nunez Produced for the Brooklyn Academy of Music. The multi-media experience attempted to re-imagine the concert-going experience by employing interactive methods to explore the relationship between performers and observers, the limits of the human voice, and the possibilities of music and image. Hossaini writes that he began working on the performance in 2006 and it was irrevocably formed by the experience of being with his mother as she died. As a result, the performance can be interpreted as imagining his mother's passage from life to death:"It is a cycle of artworks where each version involves composers, performers, designers and others who respond freely to my mother's story. Epiphany celebrates all our mothers and the vital forces that run from them through us and into the next generations of life."

2016 

 Ouroboros, video installation, Art for Tomorrow, Doha, Qatar

2017 

 Ouroboros, Video Installation, Click Festival, Helsingør, Denmark
 Why It's Kicking Off Everywhere, Video Director, Young Vic , London

2018 

 Epiphany, Video Installation, Guildhall, London, 2018
 4 Monkeys, Video Triptych, Galerie W, Paris, 2018

Filmography 
1986
 Sometimes a Blessing Can Be a Curse, director
 Ich bin Du, director
 Pentagram, director

1995
 Come to Me, director

2002
 artTV, director
 Abstraction 1, director
 Abstraction 2, director

2004
 , director: Robert Wilson, executive producer: Ali Hossaini, producer Noah Khoshbin
 Video Portrait: Robert Downey Jr., director: Robert Wilson, executive producer: Ali Hossaini, producer Noah Khoshbin
 Video Portrait: Jeanne Moreau, director: Robert Wilson, executive producer: Ali Hossaini, producer Noah Khoshbin
 Video Portrait: Isabelle Huppert, director: Robert Wilson, executive producer: Ali Hossaini, producer Noah Khoshbin
 Video Portrait: Juliette Binoche, director: Robert Wilson, executive producer: Ali Hossaini, producer Noah Khoshbin
 Video Portrait: Marianne Faithfull, director: Robert Wilson, executive producer: Ali Hossaini, producer Noah Khoshbin
 Video Portrait: Zhang Huan, director: Robert Wilson, executive producer: Ali Hossaini, producer Noah Khoshbin
 Video Portrait: Steve Buscemi, director: Robert Wilson, executive producer: Ali Hossaini, producer Noah Khoshbin
 Video Portrait: Mikhail Baryshnikov, director: Robert Wilson, executive producer: Ali Hossaini, producer Noah Khoshbin

2005
 Video Portrait: Isabella Rossellini, director: Robert Wilson, executive producer: Ali Hossaini, producer Esther Gordon & Noah Khoshbin
 Video Portrait: Sean Penn, director: Robert Wilson, executive producer: Ali Hossaini, producer Esther Gordon & Noah Khoshbin
 Video Portrait: Willem Dafoe, director: Robert Wilson, executive producer: Ali Hossaini, producer Esther Gordon & Noah Khoshbin
 Video Portrait: Robin Wright Penn, director: Robert Wilson, executive producer: Ali Hossaini, producer Esther Gordon & Noah Khoshbin
 Video Portrait: J T Leroy, director: Robert Wilson, executive producer: Ali Hossaini, producer Esther Gordon & Noah Khoshbin
 Video Portrait: William Pope L, director: Robert Wilson, executive producer: Ali Hossaini, producer Esther Gordon & Noah Khoshbin
 Video Portrait: Gabriella Orenstein, director: Robert Wilson, executive producer: Ali Hossaini, producer Esther Gordon & Noah Khoshbin
 Video Portrait: Lucinda Childs, director: Robert Wilson, executive producer: Ali Hossaini, producer Esther Gordon & Noah Khoshbin

2006
 , experimental feature, director: Ali Hossaini
 Unperception Now, director: Ali Hossaini
 Video Portrait: Princess Caroline: of Monaco, director: Robert Wilson, executive producer: * Ali Hossaini, producer Esther Gordon & Noah Khoshbin
 Video Portrait: Queen Farah Diba, director: Robert Wilson, executive producer: Ali Hossaini, producer Esther Gordon & Noah Khoshbin
 Video Portrait: Prince Alexis Schleswig-Holstein, director: Robert Wilson, executive producer: Ali Hossaini, producer Esther Gordon & Noah Khoshbin
 Video Portrait: Gao Xingjian, director: Robert Wilson, executive producer: Ali Hossaini, producer Esther Gordon & Noah Khoshbin
 Rite of the Black Sun, director: Bradley Eros, executive producer: Ali Hossaini, producer: Lili Chin
 The Aquarium, director: Pavel Wojtasik, executive producer: Ali Hossaini, producer: Lili Chin
 The Landfill, director: Pavel Wojtasik, executive producer: Ali Hossaini, producer: Lili Chin, HDTV
 Sahara Mohave, director: Leslie Thornton, executive producer: Ali Hossaini, producer: Lili Chin
 Portrait of Shanghai, director: Lili Chin, HDTV, experimental short
 Sorry, director: Gail Vachon, executive producer: Ali Hossaini, producer: Lili Chin
 Meredith Salient Field, director: Theo Angell, executive producer: Ali Hossaini, producer: Lili Chin
 Spectropia (episode), director: Toni Dove
 25 Letters (3 episodes), director: Grahame Weinbren, executive producer: Ali Hossaini, producer: Lili Chin
 The Tension Building, director: Erika Beckman, executive producer: Ali Hossaini, producer: Lili Chin
 The Mythmakers, directors: Sabine Gruffat & Ben Russell, executive producer: Ali Hossaini, producer: Lili Chin
 Poem, director: Mary Lucier, executive producer: Ali Hossaini, producer: Lili Chin, HDTV
 Light Mood Disorder, director: Jennifer Reeves, executive producer: Ali Hossaini, producer: Lili Chin
 The Bridge, director: Fred Taylor, executive producer: Ali Hossaini, producer: Lili Chin
 Urban Sonata, director: Jud Yalkut, executive producer: Ali Hossaini, producer: Lili Chin
 Stiff, director: Jenny Reeder, executive producer: Ali Hossaini, producer: Lili Chin
 Carrara Landscape, director: Angie Eng, executive producer: Ali Hossaini, producer: Lili Chin
 The Shadow Lords, director: Jose Figeroa, executive producer: Ali Hossaini, producer: Lili Chin

2007
 Medicine Woman, 13 x 30' HDTV series, executive producer: Ali Hossaini
 Ultimate Tourist Scams, 13 x 30' HDTV series, executive producer: Ali Hossaini
 Wildlife Nannies, 20 x 30' HDTV series, executive producer: Ali Hossaini
 Penny Revolution, 6 x 60' HDTV series, executive producer: Ali Hossaini
 Green Wheels, 13 x 30' HDTV series, executive producer: Ali Hossaini
 Video Portrait: Renée Fleming, director: Robert Wilson, HDTV, experimental short, executive producer: Ali Hossaini
 Video Portrait: Skunk, director: Robert Wilson, HDTV, experimental short, executive producer: Ali Hossaini

2008
 Mario's Green House, 8 x 30' HDTV series, director: Mario Van Peebles, executive producer: Ali Hossaini
 The Monkey Thieves, 13 x 30' HDTV series, executive producer: Ali Hossaini
 Lost in China, 6 x 60' HDTV series, executive producer: Ali Hossaini
 Wildlife Nannies 2, 20 x 30' HDTV series, executive producer: Ali Hossaini
 Earthtripping, 6 x 30' HDTV series, executive producer: Ali Hossaini
 Natural Born Traveler, 4 x 30' HDTV series, executive producer: Ali Hossaini
 4Monkeys, multichannel video installation, artist: Ali Hossaini
 The River, theater and video, writer: Ali Hossaini
 Noumena, theater and video, writer: Ali Hossaini
 Time is the Moving Image, theater and video, writer: Ali Hossaini
 Beethoven's Toothpaste, experimental video, director: Camille Morin, executive producer: Ali Hossaini
 Wildlife Nannies II, 20 x 30' HDTV series, executive producer: Ali Hossaini

2009
 KOOL: Dancing in My Mind, 3D HD feature, director: Robert Wilson, executive producer: Ali Hossaini

2012
 Story/Time, 3D HD feature, director: Bill T Jones, producer: Ali Hossaini

Engineering Standardisation Practice 
Hossaini's practice has led him to help produce consolidated standards to help promote the effective, ethical, creative and considered creation of AI systems, complex systems and system design. These include:

IEEE 7000-2021 - IEEE Standard Model Process for Addressing Ethical Concerns during System Design 
This is a set of processes by which organizations can include consideration of ethical values throughout the stages of concept exploration and development is established by this standard. Management and engineering in transparent communication with selected stakeholders for ethical values elicitation and prioritization is supported by this standard, involving traceability of ethical values through an operational concept, value propositions, and value dispositions in the system design. Processes that provide for traceability of ethical values in the concept of operations, ethical requirements, and ethical risk-based design are described in the standard. All sizes and types of organizations using their own life cycle models are relevant to this standard.

IEEE 7001-2021 - IEEE Approved Draft Standard for Transparency of Autonomous Systems 
The aim of this standard is to describe measurable, testable levels of transparency, so that autonomous systems can be objectively assessed and levels of compliance determined.

IEEE 2731 - Standard for a Unified Terminology for Brain-Computer Interfaces 
The standard establishes terminologies and definitions used in the description of Brain-Computer Interfaces.

Select Peer-Review Publications (Incl Standardisation Work) 

 A Functional BCI Model by the P2731 working group: Physiology, Hossaini, A., Valeriani D., Nam C. S., Ferrante, R., Mufti Mahmud M., 5 Sep 2021, Brain Computer Interfaces
 Modelling the Threat from AI: Putting Agency on the Agenda, Hossaini, A., 29 Nov 2019, RUSI Journal
 The AI Special Issue: An Introduction, Dear, K., Hossaini, A., 29 Nov 2019, RUSI Journal
 A functional BCI model by the P2731 working group: control interface, Easttom, C., Bianchi, L., Nam, C. S., Hossaini, A., Zapala, D., 8 Dec 2021, Brain Computer Interfaces
 A Functional Model for Unifying Brain Computer Interface Terminology, Easttom, C., Bianchi, L., Davide Valeriani, D., Chang S. Nam, Hossaini, A., Zapała, D., Roman-Gonzalez, A., Singh, A. K., Antonietti, A., Sahonero-Alvarez, G., and Balachandran, P., 17 March 2021, IEEE Open Journal of Engineering in Medicine and Biology
 A functional BCI model by the P2731 working group: Psychology, Zapała, D., Hossaini, A., Kianpour, M., Sahonero-Alvarez, G., Ayesh, A., 22 Jun 2021, Brain Computer Interfaces
 The BCI Glossary: a first proposal for a community review, Antonietti, A., Balachandran, P., Hossaini A., Hu Y., Valeriani, D., 3 Sep 2021, Brain Computer Interfaces
 The Manual of Digital Museum Planning, Hossaini, A., Blankenberg, N., Lord, G. D., Michaels, C., 1 Apr 2017,

References

1962 births
Living people
American people of Iraqi descent
American people of Slovak descent
Washington University in St. Louis alumni
Columbia University alumni
University of Texas at Austin College of Liberal Arts alumni
American television executives
American video artists